Zabrus lycius is a species of ground beetle in the Pelor subgenus that can be found in Dodecanese islands and in Near East.

References

Beetles described in 1915
Beetles of Asia
Beetles of Europe
Zabrus